DET or Det may refer to:
 A common abbreviation of the U.S. city of Detroit and its major professional sports teams.
 Detroit Lions of the National Football League
 Detroit Pistons of the National Basketball Association
 Detroit Tigers of Major League Baseball
 Detroit Red Wings of the National Hockey League 
 Detroit (Amtrak station), station code
 Coleman A. Young International Airport, Detroit, US, IATA Code
 Diethyltryptamine, a psychedelic drug
 Detection error tradeoff
 It (Christensen book) (Det in Danish), poetry book
 The mathematical determinant
 Department of Education (New South Wales), formerly the Department of Education and Training (DET)
 14 Intelligence Company, UK military undercover unit
 a determiner, in interlinear glossing